Meng Mei-chun (born 7 July 1977) is a Taiwanese taekwondo practitioner. She won a bronze medal in bantamweight at the 1999 World Taekwondo Championships in Edmonton, after being defeated by Jung Jae-eun in the semi final. She won a bronze medal at the 1996 Asian Taekwondo Championships.

References

External links

1977 births 
Living people
Taiwanese female taekwondo practitioners
World Taekwondo Championships medalists
Asian Taekwondo Championships medalists
20th-century Taiwanese women